Rajiv Gandhi Garden is one of the big gardens in Udaipur, Rajasthan, India. It is situated near the back of Fateh Sagar Lake, and contains a statue of Late Rajiv Gandhi, besides several other attractions like spacious children's park and a food court.

General
Rajiv Gandi Garden was built and inaugurated on 8 May 2008 by political leader Vasundhara Raje. It was built in memory of Late Rajiv Gandhi, who was the youngest Prime Minister of the Nation. This garden has beautiful fountains, trees and greenery, many statues depicting wildlife and animals throughout the garden, showing importance of plants, wildlife and conservation of water. It gives an impression of Mysore's Brindavan Garden. Besides this, there are numerous other attractions nearby like Sanjay Garden, Shilpgram, Fateh Sagar, Saheliyon-ki-Bari etc.

Accessibility
Situated on a small hillock on Rani Road near the Fateh Sagar Lake, Rajiv Gandhi Garden is a recreational park in the Malla Talai Area, at the eastern side of the Fateh Sagar Lake. It is easily accessible from the city by local transport, taxis or autorickshaws. It is around 8.5 km from Udaipur City railway station. There is a nominal entrance fee for entry into this park.

Gardens in Rajasthan
Tourist attractions in Udaipur
Parks in Udaipur
Memorials to Rajiv Gandhi